Frances Robinson may refer to:

Frances Robinson (actress) (1916–1971), American actress
Frances Mabel Robinson (1858–1956), English novelist and critic
Franny Robinson, fictional character in Meet the Robinsons
Fanny Arthur Robinson (1831–1879), English pianist, music educator and composer
Frances Robinson, character in Monkey Town

See also
Francis Robinson (disambiguation)